The Israel Music Institute (IMI) is the first publicly owned music publishing house in Israel. It is devoted primarily to the publication of Israeli art music, but also publishes books and booklets on Israeli music and composers, CDs of Israeli art music, and a periodical, IMI News. It is a non-profit organization supported by the Israel Ministry of Education, Culture and Sport.

The Institute was established in 1961 by the Israel Council for Culture and Arts for the purpose of publishing and promoting serious Israeli music by all means possible. Its first director and editor in chief (1961–1989) was William Y. Elias. The current director and editor in chief is Yoram Youngerman, appointed in 2012. The current Chair of the Board is Avi Hanani.

Since its establishment, IMI has acquired the rights to more than 2300 compositions by some 185 Israeli composers. About 85% of the works under IMI copyright have already appeared in print. IMI publishes compositions by virtually all important contemporary classical Israeli composers working in Israel since 1920. The Institute’s catalogue encompasses orchestral music, chamber music, solo instrumental music and vocal music (ranging from solo song to choral and choral-orchestral music), electronic music, several operas and ballet scores, and music for educational purposes.

The Institute has also published several musicological studies and promotional materials on Israeli composers. Since 1990, the Institute has been publishing a comprehensive bulletin, IMI News, which provides news and information on performances of Israeli music, both in Israel and around the world (including new recordings of Israeli music), and articles on recently performed or recently published works and on major issues in Israeli musical life. A list of performances of Israeli music is also available on the Institute’s website, which also lists IMI’s complete catalogue and contains several articles on Israeli music drawn from the Institute’s publications. 

The Institute has also produced several CDs of Israeli art music, both on its own label and in cooperation with several other non-profit musical institutions in Israel, as well as marketing CDs of Israeli art music produced by other labels. 

IMI collaborates with major orchestras, choirs, chamber ensembles and musical education institutions in Israel, as well as with numerous musical bodies around the world. It is also involved in several major musical events taking place in Israel, including the Paul Ben-Haim Competition – Young Artists Play Israeli Music (organised by Jeunesses Musicales Israel ); the Arthur Rubinstein International Piano Master Competition ; The International Harp Contest in Israel ; Zimriya , the World Assembly of Choirs in Israel; and others. Since 2006, IMI has been producing the Israel Music Celebrations, an annual three-day festival of Israeli music held in Jerusalem and other cities of Israel.

In addition to its role as a publishing house, IMI serves as the Israel Music Information Center (IMIC) and is a full member of the IAMIC, the International Association of Music Information Centres , maintaining reciprocal ties with over 40 member countries. It is currently in the process of creating a central library for Israeli music, which aims to make music by all Israeli composers available to musicians for perusal and consultation, both in scores and (where possible) in recordings. 

Israel Music Institute is represented by leading publishers abroad, as listed on its website.

External links 

Israel Music Institute

Music publishing companies
Publishing companies of Israel
Publishing companies established in 1961
Music organizations based in Israel